The 5th Infantry Brigade (Lebanon) is a Lebanese Army unit that fought in the Lebanese Civil War, being active since its creation in January 1983.

Origins
In the aftermath of the June–September 1982 Israeli invasion of Lebanon, President Amin Gemayel, convinced that a strong and unified national defense force was a prerequisite to rebuilding the nation, announced plans to raise a 60,000-man army organized into twelve brigades (created from existing infantry regiments), trained and equipped by France and the United States. In late 1982, the 5th Infantry Regiment was therefore re-organized and expanded to a brigade group numbering 2,000 men, mostly Maronite Christians from Mount Lebanon, which became on January 1, 1983, the 5th Infantry Brigade.

The new Infantry Brigade traced back its roots to a previous unit, the 5th Lebanese special mountain brigade of the colonial Special Troops of the Levant (French: Troupes Spéciales du Levant or TSL), raised earlier on June 1, 1943, during the French mandate over Lebanon and Syria. In July 1945 a French-Lebanese military agreement was signed, officially signalling the disbandment of the TSL, broken up to form the new Lebanese and Syrian national armies.  By the end of the month, a hodgepodge of colonial units comprising the 5th Lebanese special mountain brigade plus other smaller formations transferred from the disbanded 3rd, 6th and 7th TSL coastal brigades, was mustered together at the town of Zahlé in the Beqaa Valley and consolidated into the new Lebanese Army which was officially founded on August 1, 1945, under the command of then Colonel Fuad Chehab.

Emblem
The Brigade's emblem is composed of a Phoenix, a legendary bird that lives through five centuries, set on a sky-blue background, holding the Arabic numeral (5) five and emerging from the flames symbolizing sacrifice and resurrection, surmounted by the motto "From my ashes Lebanon arises" written in Arabic script.

Structure and organization
The new unit grew from an understrength battalion comprising three rifle companies to a fully equipped mechanized infantry brigade, capable of aligning a Headquarters' (HQ) battalion, an armoured battalion (54th) equipped with Panhard AML-90 armoured cars, AMX-13 light tanks (replaced in the 1990s by T-55A tanks donated by Syria) and M48A5 main battle tanks (MBTs), three mechanized infantry battalions (51st, 52nd and 53rd) issued with Panhard M3 VTT, AMX-VCI and M113 armored personnel carriers (APC), plus an artillery battalion (55th) fielding US M114 155 mm howitzers. The Brigade also fielded a logistics battalion, equipped with US M151A2 jeeps, Land-Rover long wheelbase series III, Chevrolet C20 and Dodge Ram (1st generation) pickups, and US M35A2 2½-ton (6x6) military trucks. Initially commanded in 1983 by Colonel Gabriel Arsuni, later replaced by Colonel khalil Kanaan, by 1987 the Brigade was stationed at Brummana in the Matn District east of Beirut, with its administrative headquarters being located at the Raymond el-Hayek Barracks in Sarba, north of Jounieh, which was a Lebanese Forces (LF) stronghold.

Combat history

The Lebanese Civil War
Under the orders of Col. Kanaan, the Fifth Brigade was positioned at the Sin el Fil suburb east of Beirut in the Matn District as a reserve force, and the Brigade's primary mission during the Mountain War was to provide support to the other Lebanese Army Brigades deployed in the Greater Beirut area. On February 6, 1984, the LAF Command of the Greater Beirut area decided to send the 52nd Infantry Battalion in M113 APCs supported by a Tank squadron provided with M48A5 MBTs on a routine patrol mission, whose planned route was to pass through the Dora suburb, the Museum crossing in the Corniche el Mazraa, the Barbir Hospital in the Ouza'i district, the Kola bridge, and the Raouché seafront residential and commercial neighbourhood. Alerted by the presence of such a large military force entering west Beirut – which they viewed suspiciously as being abnormally reinforced for a simple routine mission – Amal militia forces misinterpreted this move as a disguised attempt by Government forces to seize the Shia-controlled southwestern suburbs of the Lebanese capital by force. An alarmed Amal Command promptly issued a general mobilization order in the ranks of its militia, and as soon as the Lebanese Army patrol arrived at the Fouad Chehab bridge near the Barbir Hospital, they fell into an ambush. Several M48 Tanks that were leading the column were hit by dozens of RPG-7 anti-tank rounds, which brought the advance of the entire patrol to a halt.

During the February 1986 clashes in West Beirut between the Shia Amal militia and the Lebanese Army, the Fifth Brigade was expelled to East Beirut after the predominately Shia Sixth Brigade refused to participate in the fighting against their coreligionists of Amal.   
In 1987 Fifth brigade units were deployed to the strategic town of Souk El Gharb to prevent Druze artillerymen of the People's Liberation Army (PLA) militia from shelling the capital. By the late 1980s, the Fifth Brigade was regarded as loyal to the President of Lebanon, but observers believed that if called upon to fight a Christian militia, it might remain neutral. During the final days of the civil war, the Fifth Brigade held Souk El Gharb until October 13, 1990, when the unit was overpowered by an alliance of Druze PSP/PLA, Christian Lebanese Forces – Executive Command (LFEC) and Syrian Social Nationalist Party (SSNP) militias and Syrian Army troops.

The post-civil war years 1990–present
Upon the end of the war in October 1990, the Fifth Brigade was re-integrated into the structure of the Lebanese Armed Forces (LAF).

See also
 Army of Free Lebanon
 Lebanese Armed Forces
 Lebanese Civil War
 Lebanese Forces
 List of weapons of the Lebanese Civil War
 Mountain War (Lebanon)
 Progressive Socialist Party
 People's Liberation Army (Lebanon)
 War of Liberation (1989–1990)
 1st Infantry Brigade (Lebanon)
 2nd Infantry Brigade (Lebanon)
 3rd Infantry Brigade (Lebanon)
 4th Infantry Brigade (Lebanon)
 6th Infantry Brigade (Lebanon)
 7th Infantry Brigade (Lebanon)
 8th Infantry Brigade (Lebanon)
 9th Infantry Brigade (Lebanon)
 10th Infantry Brigade (Lebanon)
 11th Infantry Brigade (Lebanon)
 12th Infantry Brigade (Lebanon)

Notes

References

 Aram Nerguizian, Anthony H. Cordesman & Arleigh A. Burke, The Lebanese Armed Forces: Challenges and Opportunities in Post-Syria Lebanon, Burke Chair in Strategy, Center for Strategic & International Studies (CSIS), First Working Draft: February 10, 2009. – 
 Are J. Knudsen, Lebanese Armed Forces: A United Army for a Divided Country?, CMI INSIGHT, November 2014 No 9, Chr. Michelsen Institute (CMI), Bergen – of– Norway. – 
 Denise Ammoun, Histoire du Liban contemporain: Tome 2 1943–1990, Éditions Fayard, Paris 2005.  (in French) – Histoire du Liban contemporain, tome 2: 1943-1990
 Edgar O'Ballance, Civil War in Lebanon 1975–92, Palgrave Macmillan, London 1998. 
 Éric Micheletti and Yves Debay, Liban – dix jours aux cœur des combats, RAIDS magazine n.º41, October 1989 issue.  (in French)
 James Kinnear, Stephen Sewell & Andrey Aksenov, Soviet T-54 Main Battle Tank, General Military series, Osprey Publishing Ltd, Oxford 2018. 
 James Kinnear, Stephen Sewell & Andrey Aksenov, Soviet T-55 Main Battle Tank, General Military series, Osprey Publishing Ltd, Oxford 2019. 
 Joseph Hokayem, L'armée libanaise pendant la guerre: un instrument du pouvoir du président de la République (1975–1985), Lulu.com, Beyrouth 2012. , (in French) – L'armée libanaise pendant la guerre: un instrument du pouvoir du président de la République (1975-1985)
 Ken Guest, Lebanon, in Flashpoint! At the Front Line of Today’s Wars, Arms and Armour Press, London 1994, pp. 97–111.  
 Matthew S. Gordon, The Gemayels (World Leaders Past & Present), Chelsea House Publishers, 1988. 
 Moustafa El-Assad, Landing Zone Lebanon – UNIFIL 2006, Blue Steel Info, Beirut 2007. 
 Moustafa El-Assad, Civil Wars Volume 1: The Gun Trucks, Blue Steel books, Sidon 2008. 
 Oren Barak, The Lebanese Army – A National institution in a divided society, State University of New York Press, Albany 2009.  – The Lebanese Army: A National Institution in a Divided Society
 Rex Brynen, Sanctuary and Survival: the PLO in Lebanon, Boulder: Westview Press, Oxford 1990.  – Sanctuary and Survival: The PLO in Lebanon
 Robert Fisk, Pity the Nation: Lebanon at War, London: Oxford University Press, (3rd ed. 2001).  – Pity the Nation: Lebanon at War
 Samer Kassis, 30 Years of Military Vehicles in Lebanon, Beirut: Elite Group, 2003. 
 Samer Kassis, Véhicules Militaires au Liban/Military Vehicles in Lebanon 1975–1981, Trebia Publishing, Chyah 2012. 
 Samuel M. Katz, Lee E. Russel, and Ron Volstad, Armies in Lebanon 1982–84, Men-at-Arms series 165, Osprey Publishing Ltd, London 1985.  
 Samuel M. Katz and Ron Volstad, Arab Armies of the Middle East wars 2, Men-at-Arms series 194, Osprey Publishing Ltd, London 1988. 
 Steven J. Zaloga, Tank battles of the Mid-East Wars (2): The wars of 1973 to the present, Concord Publications, Hong Kong 2003.  – Tank Battles of the Mid-East Wars : (2) The Wars of 1973 to the present
 Thomas Collelo (ed.), Lebanon: a country study, Library of Congress, Federal Research Division, Headquarters, Department of the Army (DA Pam 550-24), Washington D.C., December 1987 (Third edition 1989). –

External links
 Histoire militaire de l'armée libanaise de 1975 à 1990 (in French)
 Lebanese Armed Forces (LAF) Official Website
 Lebanon Military Guide from GlobalSecurity.org
 CIA – The World Factbook – Lebanon
 Global Fire Power – Lebanon Military Strength
 Lebanon army trying to rearm and modernize itself
 Lebanese Military Wish List 2008/2009 – New York Times

Military units and formations of Lebanon
Military units and formations established in 1983
1983 establishments in Lebanon